A Sailor on Horseback (Swedish: En sjöman till häst) is a 1940 Swedish comedy film directed by Emil A. Lingheim and starring Edvard Persson, Karl-Arne Holmsten and Elvin Ottoson.

The film's art direction was by Max Linder.

Main cast
 Edvard Persson as Lasse Borg 
 Karl-Arne Holmsten as Karl Gustav Bremberg 
 Elvin Ottoson as Baron Axel von Berger  
 Olga Andersson as Mrs. von Berger  
 Elly Christiansson as Paula von Berger 
 Per Björkman as Baron Bengt von Kransvärd 
 Ivar Kåge as Lawyer  
 Bullan Weijden as Mina  
 Mim Persson as Mrs. Ek  
 Ernst Malmquist as Larsson

References

Bibliography 
 Qvist, Per Olov & von Bagh, Peter. Guide to the Cinema of Sweden and Finland. Greenwood Publishing Group, 2000.

External links 
 

1940 films
1940 comedy films
Swedish comedy films
1940s Swedish-language films
Films directed by Emil A. Lingheim
Swedish black-and-white films
1940s Swedish films